The Lawrence Township School District is a community public school district that serves students in pre-kindergarten through eighth grade from Lawrence Township, in Cumberland County, New Jersey, United States.

As of the 2018–19 school year, the district, comprised of one school, had an enrollment of 507 students and 42.4 classroom teachers (on an FTE basis), for a student–teacher ratio of 12.0:1.

The district is classified by the New Jersey Department of Education as being in District Factor Group "CD", the sixth-highest of eight groupings. District Factor Groups organize districts statewide to allow comparison by common socioeconomic characteristics of the local districts. From lowest socioeconomic status to highest, the categories are A, B, CD, DE, FG, GH, I and J.

For ninth through twelfth grades, public school students in Lawrence Township are assigned to one of two school districts based on the location of their residence. Students attend high school either in Bridgeton or Millville, based on sending/receiving relationships with the respective school districts, the Bridgeton Public Schools and the Millville Public Schools. Students sent to Bridgeton attend Bridgeton High School. Students sent to Millville join students from Commercial Township, Maurice River Township and Woodbine and attend Memorial High School for ninth grade and half of the tenth grade and Millville Senior High School for half of the tenth grade through the twelfth grade.

School
The Myron L. Powell School had an enrollment of 500 students in grades PreK-8 the 2018–19 school year.

Administration
Core members of the district's administration are:New Jersey School Directory for Cumberland County, New Jersey Department of Education. Accessed May 14, 2017.</ref>
Dr. Shellymarie Magan, Superintendent
Lisa DiNovi, Business Administrator / Board Secretary

Board of education
The district's board of education, comprised of nine members, sets policy and oversees the fiscal and educational operation of the district through its administration. As a Type II school district, the board's trustees are elected directly by voters to serve three-year terms of office on a staggered basis, with three seats up for election each year held (since 2012) as part of the November general election. The board appoints a superintendent to oversee the day-to-day operation of the district.

References

External links
Myron L. Powell Elementary School

School Data for the Myron L. Powell Elementary School, National Center for Education Statistics

Lawrence Township, Cumberland County, New Jersey
New Jersey District Factor Group CD
School districts in Cumberland County, New Jersey